Söderbärke is a locality in Smedjebacken Municipality, Dalarna County, Sweden, with 924 inhabitants in 2010.

References

External links
www.soderbarke.nu - official website

Populated places in Dalarna County
Populated places in Smedjebacken Municipality